Neoplecostomus corumba is a species of armored catfish endemic to Brazil.  This species grows to a length of  SL.

References
 

corumba
Fish of South America
Fish of Brazil
Endemic fauna of Brazil
Taxa named by Cláudio Henrique Zawadzki
Taxa named by Carla Simone Pavanelli
Taxa named by Francisco Langeani-Neto
Fish described in 2008